Sérgio Ricardo João, also known as Sérgio João (born 26 December 1968) is a retired Brazilian football striker. He became top goalscorer of Bolivia's highest league in 1996 and Copa Libertadores in 1998.

References

1968 births
Living people
Brazilian footballers
Club Bolívar players
América de Cali footballers
C.D. Jorge Wilstermann players
Vitória F.C. players
Club Blooming players
Club Independiente Petrolero players
Club Aurora players
Bolivian Primera División players
Categoría Primera A players
Primeira Liga players
Association football forwards
Brazilian expatriate footballers
Expatriate footballers in Bolivia
Brazilian expatriate sportspeople in Bolivia
Expatriate footballers in Colombia
Brazilian expatriate sportspeople in Colombia
Expatriate footballers in Portugal
Brazilian expatriate sportspeople in Portugal